Bells Creek, an urban watercourse that is part of the Hawkesbury-Nepean catchment, is located in Greater Western Sydney, New South Wales, Australia.

Course and features

In 2005, the Bells Creek catchment area was rated the fourteenth-highest polluting catchment out of the twenty-two catchments in the Blacktown local government area. Bells Creek catchment can be split into two defined halves. The northern half of the catchment consists of predominantly semi-rural and light industry whilst the southern catchment is older residential. There are areas of intact creek with high ecological values in the lower catchment and it is important to protect them through upper catchment works. The catchment also contains areas of remnant vegetation that form vital corridors for native fauna. Due to the size and condition of these remnants, they form good habitat and important refuge areas. The creek south of Richmond Road is highly modified (piped) and has few remaining natural values. The creek forms a valuable function for flood mitigation. Downstream of Richmond Road the adjoining landholders have had severe impacts on the creek. There are blockages through the incorporation of weirs for irrigation and the construction of levee banks for limited flood protection. However, the channel still retains many natural features including canopy vegetation and in-stream habitat.

Evidence of early Aboriginal people has been found in several locations within the City of Blacktown, such as on the banks of the South Creek and its tributaries, including Eastern Creek.

Bells Creek is transversed by the Westlink M7 and the Richmond railway line at Quakers Hill.

See also 

 Rivers of New South Wales

References

External links
 

Creeks and canals of Sydney
Hawkesbury River